John H. Flavell (born August 9, 1928 in Rockland, Massachusetts) is an American developmental psychologist specializing in children's cognitive development.

Education
After serving in The United States Army for two years from 1945 to 1947, John H. Flavell enrolled at Northeastern University where he earned his bachelor's degree in psychology. After graduation, he was admitted into the clinical psychology program at Clark University and Harvard University. John H. Flavell earned his MA from Clark University in 1952 and in 1955 he earned his Ph.D.  Through the discovery of new developmental phenomena and analysis of the theories of Jean Piaget, Flavell shifted the direction of developmental psychology in the United States.

Career
In 1955-1956 Flavell worked as a clinical psychologist at Fort Lyon V.A. hospital in Colorado.  After leaving Fort Lyon he accepted a position at the University of Rochester New York as a clinical associate and then as an assistant professor of psychology.  In 1965 Flavell was asked to become a full-time professor at the University of Minnesota's Institute of Child Development.  Flavell left after 10 years to join Stanford University in 1976 where he became one of their professors.

Some of Flavell's accomplishments include writing a book on children's cognitive development titled The Developmental Psychology of Jean Piaget in 1963. In 1970 Flavell was the president of the APA's division of Developmental Psychology.  Flavell served for eight years on the SRCD's (Society for Research in Child Development) Governing Council and is a charter member of the editorial board of Cognitive Psychology.  Flavell has written several books and more than 100 articles and in 1984 he received the Distinguished Scientific Contribution Award of the American Psychological Association (APA).

  He was recognized with an Award for Distinguished Scientific Contributions from the American Psychological Society in 1984, and was elected to the United States National Academy of Sciences in 1994.   He is currently an emeritus professor of developmental psychology at Stanford.

Research
Flavell has conducted extensive research into metacognition and the child's theory of mind. One of his most famous contributions to the field is his work on children's developing understanding of the distinction between appearance and reality.  These studies assessed young children's ability to acknowledge that a given object is really one kind of thing, yet appears to be another kind of thing, or that a given piece of material is really one color, yet appears to be another color under particular circumstances.  Flavell and his colleagues have found that whereas most three-year-olds fail these tasks, five-year-olds and older four-year-olds succeed on them.  Flavell interprets this developmental difference as suggesting that children acquire the notion of mental representation of reality as distinct from reality itself.  The appearance-reality paradigm, along with the false-belief task, is widely used as diagnostic of theory of mind development during early childhood.  Flavell's other work has addressed children's developing understanding of perception, perspective-taking, and their introspective insight into their own subjective experiences.

References

American developmental psychologists
Clark University alumni
Stanford University Department of Psychology faculty
1928 births
Living people
Members of the United States National Academy of Sciences
People from Rockland, Massachusetts
Northeastern University alumni